Real World Haskell is an O'Reilly Media book, about the Haskell programming language by Bryan O'Sullivan, Don Stewart, and John Goerzen and features a rhinoceros beetle as its mascot. It won a 2009 Jolt Award.

References

External links
 
 Full text

O'Reilly Media books
Computer_programming_books